General Dodge may refer to:

Charles C. Dodge (1841–1910), Union Army brigadier general
Francis S. Dodge (1842–1908), U.S. Army brigadier general
George Sullivan Dodge (1838–1881), Union Army brevet brigadier general
Grenville M. Dodge (1831–1916), Union Army major general
Henry Dodge (1782–1867), Michigan Territorial Militia major general

See also
General Dodds (disambiguation)